Air Vice Marshal (rtd) Frank Onaweneryene Ajobena, psc+, fwc, MSc, CON was the military administrator of Abia State from 28 August 1991 until January 1992.

Post service life

When Felix Mujakperuo was chosen as Orodje of Okpe Kingdom in 2004, Ajobena filed suit in favor of his own claim to the throne. Ajobena's suit was never, and Mujakperuo was installed as Orhue I, Orodje of Okpe on July 29, 2006.

References

Living people
Igbo politicians
Nigerian Air Force air marshals
Governors of Abia State
1949 births